Hooray for Bix! is an album by American jazz guitarist Marty Grosz and his Honoris Causa Jazz Band featuring compositions associated with cornetist Bix Beiderbecke recorded in 1957 for the Riverside label.

Reception

Allmusic reviewer Scott Yanow stated: "Recommended. But why did it take Marty Grosz so long to catch on?".

Track listing
 "Changes" (Walter Donaldson) - 2:44
 "Cryin' All Day" (Chauncey Morehouse, Frankie Trumbauer) - 4:19
 "Lonely Melody" (Sam Coslow, Hal Dyson, Benny Meroff) - 3:16
 "I'm Gonna Meet My Sweetie Now" (Benny Davis, Jesse Greer) - 4:11
 "Sorry" (Raymond Klages, Howdy Quicksell) - 3:49
 "My Pet" (Milton Ager, Jack Yellen) - 3:08
 "The Love Nest" (Otto Harbach, Louis A. Hirsch, Walter Hirsch) - 3:49
 "Clementine" - 4:03
 "Oh, Miss Hannah" (Jessie Deppen, Thekla Hollingsworth) - 4:23
 "Wa-Da-Da (Everybody's Doin' It Now)" (Harry Barris, James Cavanaugh) - 3:42
 "For No Reason at All in C" (Bix Beiderbecke, Frankie Trumbauer) - 4:28
 "Because My Baby Don't Mean 'Maybe' Now" (Donaldson, Frank Teschemacher, Guy d'Hardelot) - 3:38

Personnel 
 Marty Grosz – guitar, vocals
 Harry Budd – trombone
 Carl Halen – cornet
 Turk Santos – cornet, guitar
 Bob Skiver – tenor saxophone, clarinet
 Frank Chace – clarinet, baritone saxophone
 Tut Soper – piano
 Chuck Neilson – double bass
 Pepper Boggs – drums

References 

1958 albums
Albums produced by Orrin Keepnews
Riverside Records albums